Marssac-sur-Tarn is a railway station in Marssac-sur-Tarn, Occitanie, France. It is on the Tessonnières to Albi railway line. The station is served by TER (local) services operated by SNCF.

Train services
The following services currently call at Marssac-sur-Tarn:
local service (TER Occitanie) Toulouse–Albi–Rodez

References

Railway stations in Tarn (department)